The ITUC Regional Organisation for Asia and Pacific (ITUC Asia Pacific) is a regional organisation of the International Trade Union Confederation representing trade unions from countries in Asia and Oceania.  It has 40 affiliated organisations in 28 countries, claiming a membership of 30 million people.

History
The federation was founded in 2007, when the ICFTU-Asia Pacific Regional Organisation merged with the World Confederation of Labour's Brotherhood of Asian Trade Unions.

Affiliates
The following national organisations are affiliated to ITUC Asia Pacific (ordered by country):
Australia
Australian Council of Trade Unions
Bangladesh
Bangladesh Free Trade Union Congress
Bangladesh Jatiyatabadi Sramik Dal
Bangladesh Labour Federation
Jatiya Sramik League
Republic of China (Taiwan)
Chinese Federation of Labour
Cook Islands
Cook Islands Workers Association Incorporated
Fiji
Fiji Trades Union Congress
French Polynesia
A Tia I Mua
India
Hind Mazdoor Sabha
Indian National Trade Union Congress
Israel
General Federation of Labour in Israel
Japan
Japanese Trade Union Confederation
Jordan
The General Federation of Jordanian Trade Unions
Kiribati
Kiribati Trades Union Congress
South Korea
Federation of Korean Trade Unions
Korean Confederation of Trade Unions
Malaysia
Malaysian Trades Union Congress
Mongolia
Confederation of Mongolian Trade Unions
Myanmar
Confederation of Trade Unions Myanmar - CTUM
Nepal
Nepal Trade Union Congress
New Caledonia
Union Des Syndicates des Oudriers et Employes de Nouvelle Caledonie
New Zealand
New Zealand Council of Trade Unions
Pakistan
All Pakistan Federation of Labour
All Pakistan Federation of Trade Unions
Pakistan National Federation of Trade Unions
Papua New Guinea
Papua New Guinea Trade Union Congress
Philippines
Trade Union Congress of the Philippines
Federation of Free Workers
Samoa
Samoa Workers Congress
Singapore
National Trades Union Congress
Sri Lanka
Ceylon Workers' Congress
Thailand
Labour Congress of Thailand
Thai Trade Union Congress
Tonga
Friendly Islands Teachers' Association
Turkey
Confederation of Revolutionary Trade Unions of Turkey
Confederation of Turkish Trade Unions
The Confederation of Turkish Real Trade Unions
Confederation of Public Servants Trade Unions
Vanuatu
Vanuatu Council of Trade Unions

Leadership

General Secretary
2017: Shoya Yoshida

President
2015: Felix Anthony

References

External links
ITUC Asia Pacific website

 
International organizations based in Asia
International organizations based in Oceania
Trade unions established in 2007